Michael Demaine (1 March 1948 – 15 September 2013) was an Australian rules footballer who played with Hawthorn in the Victorian Football League (VFL).

Demaine, who came from Mornington, was a wingman and half forward flanker. He made 10 appearances for Hawthorn in the 1965 VFL season.

In the opening round of the 1966 season, against Collingwood, Demaine was seriously injured and had to have a ruptured kidney removed. He never appeared for Hawthorn again but played some good football for Mt Eliza.

References

1948 births
Australian rules footballers from Victoria (Australia)
Hawthorn Football Club players
2013 deaths